Nakayale, also known as Nakayale Keengulu is a village in northern Namibia near Outapi in Omusati Region situated 86km northwest of Oshakati and 4km from Outapi.  It is in Anamulenge Constituency.

History of the mission station
An auxiliary mission station was founded in Nakayale in 1917. The teacher Sakeus Iihuhua, who had graduated from the teacher training seminary of Oniipa, was stationed there. Around that time, a great many Ovambadja moved from Angola to the Ombalantu tribal area, in order to escape the famine in Angola.

In 1925, Nakayale became an official mission station, when Heikki Saari settled permanently there. In the same year, Sakeus Iihuhua was ordained a minister, as one of the first Ovambos who became pastors. The following year the Aambalantu built a church in Nakayale, mainly by themselves. The missionary Heikki Saari relates, that “the youngest builder was a four-year-old ward of the mission station, who could only carry one brick at a time, but the tirelessness of this small brick bearer was an utterly moving sight to see.”

Pastor Saari worked in Nakayale until 1931, when he was replaced by Tuure Vapaavuori. His wife Aino Vapaavuori, who was a deaconess, took care of the policlinic at Nakayale.

During the years 1931–1935 the Nakayale Parish primary schools had between 163 and 217 students. The school was taught in the church building, but as there were two classes to teach there by two teachers, it was thought that better premises were needed, and thus Vapaavuori began in 1934 to build a separate school building. In 1935, the Vapaavuori couple were transferred to Ondonga, to the Onayena mission station.

Later Finnish missionaries in Nakayale included nurse Ebba von Pfaler (1934–47, 1952–57), doctor Eila Plathán-Saarinen (1951–54) and nurses Helmi Makkonen, Kaino Kovanen and Anneli Linkola.

Climate

Surroundings
Nakayale has two schools, Nakayale Primary School, now named the Sakeus Iihuhua School and Erkki Tauya Junior Secondary School. There is a main branch of ELCIN (Evangelical Lutheran Church in Namibia) church for all northern ELCIN churches which was named after the village itself, and a center for disabled people. The primary local language is Oshiwambo Oshimbalantu and some residents also speak English. Nakayale is one of the hottest places in northern Namibia with temperatures ranging between 26 and 30 degrees Celsius. Villages around Nakayale are Okapanda, Onamulunga, Omukoko, Okaile,  Oshambomba City, Ondjamba Nevu, Okalonda, and Okakwa.  Blue Birds FC, a soccer team, is also from Nakayale.

References

Sources

Populated places in the Omusati Region
Finnish Evangelical Lutheran Mission mission stations in Ombalantu